Commodore The Hon. William Kerr was a Royal Navy officer who served as Commander-in-Chief of the Jamaica Station.

Naval career
Born a younger son of the Earl of Lothian, Kerr was promoted to post captain on 14 May 1690 on appointment to the command of the fourth-rate HMS Deptford. He transferred to the command of the fourth-rate HMS Burlington in 1696, of the third-rate HMS Lenox later the same year and of the third-rate HMS Eagle in 1700. He went on to receive the command the third-rate HMS Revenge in 1702.
 
Promoted to Commodore, Kerr became Commander-in-Chief of the Jamaica Station in 1706. Starved of resources including medicines to treat his men, who were sick from tropical diseases, Kerr was unable to prevent the Spanish ships from leaving port. On return his to England he was prosecuted, impeached and then dismissed from the Royal Navy.

References

Sources

 

Royal Navy officers
Impeached British officials
Impeached officials removed from office